Shuri-ye Bozorg (also Romanized as Shūrī-ye Bozorg, Shūrī, Shūrī Bozorg, and Shūrī-Yebozorg) is a village in Takht-e Jolgeh Rural District, in the Central District of Firuzeh County, Razavi Khorasan Province, Iran. At the 2006 census, its population was 667, in 168 families.

References 

Populated places in Firuzeh County